Aybolit-66 is a 1966 Soviet family comedy film directed by Rolan Bykov. It is based on a story by Kornei Chukovsky. The film features Oleg Yefremov as the good Aibolit and Rolan Bykov as the evil Barmalei.

Plot
In Africa, monkeys have become sick. The news was reported to Dr. Aybolit by Monkey Chi-Chi, but Barmalei with his gang are attempting to hamper their plan. At first they seize the doctor's ship on the sea and throw out Dr. Aybolit. At the end, the robbers by order of chief Barmalei collect all the local pirates on the river bank. In conclusion the good doctor manages to overpower Barmalei using drugs and cures the monkeys.

Cast
 Oleg Yefremov as Doctor Aybolit
 Lidiya Knyazeva as Chi-Chi the Monkey
 Yevgeni Vasilyev as Avva the Dog
 Rolan Bykov as Barmalei / Author
 Aleksei Smirnov as Jolly pirate
 Frunzik Mkrtchyan as Sad pirate
 Leonid Yengibarov as cheerful clown #1
 Konstantin Khudyakov as pirate
 Igor Yasulovich as white clown
 Ilya Rutberg as orchestra conductor
 Vadim Grachyov as cheerful clown #2
 Gurgen Janibekyan as old pirate

Influence
In 1971, Canadian filmmaker Gerald Potterton released the film Tiki Tiki, which intercut footage from Aybolit-66 with original animated sequences to recontextualize it in the style of Woody Allen's 1966 film What's Up, Tiger Lily?. Alexander Kuznetsov, the original production designer of Aybolit-66, was named the winner of the Canadian Film Award for Best Art Direction/Production Design at the 23rd Canadian Film Awards.

References

External links
 

1966 films
1966 in the Soviet Union
Mosfilm films
1960s musical comedy films
Films directed by Rolan Bykov
Medical-themed films
Soviet musical comedy films
Russian musical comedy films
Films shot in Azerbaijan
1967 comedy films
1967 films
1966 comedy films
1960s Russian-language films